The 1994 USAC FF2000 National Championship was the first USF2000 national championship sanctioned by the United States Auto Club. It was the final season of USF2000 racing sanctioned by USAC. The following season would be sanctioned by SCCA Pro Racing. Clay Collier, racing with Ruyle Race Service, won the championship.

Race calendar and results

Drivers' Championship

References

Externatl links
 The 1994 Night before the 5000 FF2000 race on Youtube.

1994 in American motorsport
U.S. F2000 National Championship seasons